George Paton may refer to:

George Henry Tatham Paton (1895–1917), Scottish recipient of the Victoria Cross
George Whitecross Paton (1902–1985), Australian legal scholar and Vice Chancellor of Melbourne University
George Paton (cricketer) (1879–1950), Australian cricketer
George Paton (footballer), Scottish footballer
George Paton (American football executive) (born 1970), general manager of the Denver Broncos

See also
George Patton (disambiguation)